Jon Cleary (born August 11, 1962) is a British-born American funk and R&B musician based in New Orleans, Louisiana, where he has studied the "musical culture and life of New Orleans" according to his website. Cleary is an accomplished pianist as well as being a multi-instrumentalist, vocalist and songwriter.

Cleary has performed with a number of prolific musicians including Eric Clapton, Bonnie Raitt, Taj Mahal, B.B. King, Ryan Adams, and Eric Burdon. Compositions by Cleary have been recorded by such notable musicians as Taj Mahal, Bonnie Raitt, and John Scofield on his 2009 album Piety Street.

Cleary's current band is Jon Cleary & The Absolute Monster Gentlemen, who have released two albums. Their album Go Go Juice won the Grammy Award for Best Regional Roots Music Album in the 58th Annual Grammy Awards.

Early life 
Cleary is originally from Cranbrook, Kent, in the south-east of England. He attended Colliers Green Primary School, Angley Secondary and then Cranbrook School. His father played guitar but it was his uncle, returning from trips to America bringing recordings of Professor Longhair and others, who inspired his love for R&B. Cleary's focus was always more on art and music and everything that goes with it, than academic pursuits, and he soon left schooling behind to develop a life in music.

Career

Jon Cleary & The Absolute Monster Gentlemen

Jon Cleary & the Absolute Monster Gentlemen consist of Cleary on keyboard and vocals, Derwin "Big D" Perkins (born 1974) on guitar, Cornell C. Williams (born 1962) on bass and backup vocals, and A.J. Hall on drums.  All of the band members, except for Cleary, were born in New Orleans.

The band is generally well received, drawing large crowds of locals at classic New Orleans venues like Tipitina's and the Maple Leaf Bar.  They are also a mainstay at the annual Jazz and Heritage Festival and have played at Bonnaroo as well as other music festivals. Rolling Stone'''s David Fricke wrote of the Pin Your Spin album: "Cleary can be an absolute monster on his own, but Cleary’s full combo R&B is as broad, deep and roiling as the Mississippi river, the combined swinging product of local keyboard tradition, Cleary’s vocal-songwriting flair for moody Seventies soul and the spunky-meters roll of his Gentlemen".

Other
Cleary is interviewed on screen and appears in performance footage in the 2005 documentary film Make It Funky!, which presents a history of New Orleans music and its influence on rhythm and blues, rock and roll, funk and jazz. In the film, Cleary performs a piano duo of "Tipitina" with Allen Toussaint.

Cleary played piano on Annika Chambers' 2016 album, Wild & Free.

Discography
Albums
 Alligator Lips & Dirty Rice (Ace, 1994)
 Moonburn (Virgin/Poinblank, 1999)
 Jon Cleary & the Absolute Monster Gentlemen (Basin Street, 2002)
 Pin Your Spin (Basin Street, 2004)
 Do Not Disturb (EP) (FHQ, 2007)
 Mo Hippa (FHQ, 2008)
 Occapella (FHQ, 2012)
 Go Go Juice (FHQ, 2015)Dyna-Mite (FHQ, 2018)

Appearances
 Goin' Home: A Tribute to Fats Domino - with Bonnie Raitt - Track 10 "I'm in Love Again/All by Myself" (Vanguard, 2007)
 Piety Street - by John Scofield (EmArcy, 2009)
 Plays Well with Others'' - by Greg Koch - Track 3 "Walk Before You can Crawl" (Rhymes With Chalk Music, 2013)

References

External links

 Jon Cleary's official website
 

1962 births
American funk musicians
American rhythm and blues musicians
Rhythm and blues pianists
Rhythm and blues musicians from New Orleans
People from Cranbrook, Kent
Songwriters from Louisiana
Living people
21st-century pianists